Haier Group Corporation is a Chinese multinational home appliances and consumer electronics company headquartered in Qingdao, Shandong. It designs, develops, manufactures and sells products including refrigerators, air conditioners, washing machines, dryers, microwave ovens, mobile phones, computers, and televisions. The home appliances business, namely Haier Smart Home, has seven global brands – Haier, Casarte, Leader, GE Appliances, Fisher & Paykel, Aqua and Candy.

According to data released by Euromonitor, Haier was the number one brand globally in major appliances for 10 consecutive years from 2009 to 2018. The Haier brand was also recognized by BrandZ in 2019 as the most valuable IoT ecosystem brand in the world with a brand value of $16.3 billion. In 2019, Haier Smart Home ranked 448 on Fortune's Global 500 list with a revenue of $27.7 billion.

Haier Group also consisted of two listed subsidiaries in three exchanges: Haier Smart Home (ex-Qingdao Haier Co., Ltd.), Haier Electronics Group Co., Ltd., and "D-share" listing of Haier Smart Home in China Europe International Exchange of Frankfurt.

History 
The origins of Haier date back long before the actual founding of the company. In the 1920s, a refrigerator factory was built in Qingdao to supply the Chinese market. After the 1949 establishment of the People's Republic of China, the factory was then taken over and turned into a state-owned enterprise.

By the 1980s, the factory had a debt of over CN¥1.4 million and suffered from dilapidated infrastructure, poor management, and lack of quality controls, resulting from the planned economic system and relevant policies. Production had slowed, rarely surpassing 80 refrigerators a month, and the factory was close to bankruptcy. The Qingdao government hired a young assistant city-manager, Zhang Ruimin, responsible for a number of city-owned appliance companies. Zhang was appointed the managing director of the factory in 1984.

Founding
Haier had been founded as Qingdao Refrigerator Co. in 1984. With China opening up to world markets, foreign corporations began searching for partnerships in China. One of these, Germany's refrigerator company Liebherr, entered into a joint-venture contract with Qingdao Refrigerator Co., offering technology and equipment to its Chinese counterpart. Refrigerators were to be manufactured under the name of Qindao-Liebherr. The current brand "Haier" came from the last two syllables of the Chinese transliteration of Liebherr.

The installation of Liebherr's equipment and technology was accompanied by new quality control and management processes. By 1986, Qingdao Refrigerator had returned to profitability and grew in sales at an average of 83 percent annually. Between 1984 and 2000 sales grew from CNY ¥3.5 million to ¥40.5 billion.

In 1988, the municipal government asked Haier to take over some of the city's other ailing appliance manufacturers. The company assumed control of Qingdao Electroplating Company (manufacturing microwave ovens). In 1991, the company changed its name to "Qingdao Haier Group" and acquired Qingdao Air Conditioner Plant and Qingdao Freezer. The company's name was simplified to its current name "Haier" in 1992. In 1995, the company took over Qingdao Red Star Electronics Co., a washing machine manufacturer, along with five of its subsidiaries. Haier acquired seven companies between 1995 and 1997, and began exporting to foreign markets.

International expansion
In Southeast Asia, Haier opened production facilities in Indonesia in 1996 and the Philippines in 1997 and failed in an attempt to enter the Thai market due to the presence of local competitors.

Haier entered the US market in 1999. In the US it focused upon two niche markets in compact refrigerators and electric wine cellars. Haier began to manufacture full-sized refrigerators for North American market. This would bring it into direct competition with established American companies GE, Whirlpool, Frigidaire, and Maytag. As part of its strategy, Haier built a production facility in the United States at Camden, South Carolina, opened in 2000. By 2002, US revenues reached USD $200 million, still small compared to its overall revenue of $7 billion. Also in 2002, Haier moved into the Greenwich Savings Bank Building in midtown Manhattan. Formerly the headquarters for the Greenwich Savings Bank, the  building was built in 1924 in the neo-classical style.

Production facilities were constructed in Pakistan in 2002 (see Haier Pakistan) and Jordan in 2003. In Africa, Haier has plants in five countries: Tunisia, Nigeria, Egypt, Algeria and South Africa. The company also purchased a Meneghetti's factory in Italy and began placing its products in European retail chains, either under its own brand or under OEM agreements with foreign partners. Currently Haier has entered into a joint venture agreement with the government of Venezuela.

Haier Appliances (India) P. Ltd initiated its commercial operations in January 2004. Its headquarters is in New Delhi, and in 2015 it had 33 operations, including those in Mumbai, Bangalore, Chennai, and Kolkata.  It was listed among the top 20 most trusted brands in India by The Brand Trust Report, a study conducted by Trust Research Advisory.

In June 2005, Haier made a bid to acquire Maytag Corporation, backed by private equity funds Blackstone Group and Bain Capital. The bid was for US$1.28 billion, or $16 per share, topping a previous offer of $14.26 per share made by Ripplewood Holdings. In the end, however, Maytag was bought by Michigan based Whirlpool Corporation which offered $1.7 billion in cash and stock, or $21 per share, plus assumed debt.

In 2009, Haier surpassed Whirlpool to become the fourth largest refrigerator producer in terms of sales with a global market share of 6.3%.

In 2012, Haier Group acquired the appliance business from New Zealand-based Fisher & Paykel, and Sanyo's Southeast Asian appliance manufacturing unit.

In June 2016 Haier Group acquired General Electric's appliance division for $5.4 billion. GE Appliances is headquartered in Louisville, KY.

On 28 September 2018, it was announced that Haier had acquired Italy based Candy group.

By 2020, Haier had been the world's number one home appliance brand for 12 consecutive years.

Technology 
In 2015, Haier began investigating how the internet of things could be integrated into their devices.  The company cited by the Stanford Artificial Intelligence Laboratory, which found three barriers to the adoption of smart home technology: lack of unified protocols/single point of access, passive services and the lack of complete solutions. At the time Haier's core competencies lay within the large appliance sector and not the small electronics sector. Subsequently, they partnered with the then leading IoT platform IngDan owned by the Cogobuy Group to overcame their shortcomings. By utilising Cogobuy's ecosystem and supply chain, they were able to integrate IngDan's portfolio of components, modules, and edge voice analysis into smart appliance products. Haier introduced their smart appliances across seven product lines in the major appliance industry: air, water, clothes care, security, voice control, health and information.

Company strategy 
Zhang Ruimin, soon after becoming managing director in 1985, ordered his employees to destroy 76 refrigerators with sledgehammers following a customer complaint in an effort to radically change the company's culture to one that embodies quality control practices. At the time, Chinese brands for domestically produced consumer goods were generally regarded by overseas consumer markets as being of poor quality, even when compared subjectively with foreign brands manufactured in China. The cultural transformation towards quality driven manufacturing resulted in Haier becoming the first company in China to get ISO 9001 certification. Haier also announces environmental sustainable development strategy to improve the environment by conserving energy and recycling. In 2018，Haier got “Greener China Business Award” due to its outstanding efforts to protect the environment. In 2015, Haier joined WIPO GREEN as an official partner in a effort to address climate change.

Ownership structure
In 1993, it listed a subsidiary Qingdao Haier Refrigerator Co. on the Shanghai Stock Exchange, raising CN¥370 million. In 2005, Haier entered the Hong Kong Stock Exchange through a "backdoor listing" by acquiring a controlling stake in a publicly listed joint venture Haier-CCT Holdings Ltd.. Haier is also an index stock of the Dow Jones China 88 Index.

Controversy 
In 2014, Haier was accused by German media of allegedly delivering smartphones and tablets with pre-installed malware.

See also

TCL Corporation
GE Appliances
Siemens AG
AB Electrolux
Maytag Corporation
Samsung Electronics
Sanyo

References

External links

Haier official website
Haier Group user manuals

 
Home appliance manufacturers of China
Electronics companies of China
Display technology companies
Consumer electronics brands
Home appliance brands
Heating, ventilation, and air conditioning companies
Mobile phone manufacturers
Mobile phone companies of China
Electronics companies established in 1984
Chinese companies established in 1984
Multinational companies headquartered in China
Chinese brands